Volleyball events were contested at the 1962 Asian Games in Jakarta, Indonesia.

Medalists

Volleyball

Nine-a-side volleyball

Medal table

Draw
The draw for volleyball competition was held on 23 August 1962. Three pools were drawn for the international system (six players) in the men's competition, the other competitions were played in round robin format.

Pool A

Pool B

Pool C

* Republic of China withdrew from both international and far eastern competitions because Indonesian government refused to issue visas for the Taiwanese delegation.

Final standing

Volleyball

Men

Women

Nine-a-side volleyball

Men

Women

References

External links
 Women's Results
 Men's Results

 
1962 Asian Games events
1962
Asian Games
1962 Asian Games
1962 in Indonesian sport